Welcome To Goon Island is the first album by XX Teens, released by Mute Records. It had been set for a mainstream release on 28 July 2008 but was made available from selected independent record shops four weeks before that date. Each of those stores gave away free posters of the album.

The song "Darlin'" was included in "NME's Tracks Of The Year 2007".

Track listing
"The Way We Were" - 3:48
"B-54" - 3:19
"Round" - 3:03
"Ba (Ba-Ba Ba)" - 2:56
"Onkawara" - 3:26
"(Reprise)" - 0:43
"Only You" - 2:23
"My Favourite Hat" - 4:21
"Darlin'" - 4:12
"Sun Comes Up" - 4:05
"For Brian Haw" - 5:40
"How to Reduce the Chances of Being a Terror Victim" - 3:54

References

External links
Welcome To Goon Island album review at bbc.co.uk
Welcome To Goon Island at Mute Records

2008 debut albums
XX Teens albums